Jo Inge Bjørnebye (31 October 1946 – 24 March 2013) was a Norwegian ski jumper, born in Våler, Hedmark. He competed at the 1968 Winter Olympics in Grenoble, where he placed 31st in the normal hill. He competed at the 1972 Winter Olympics in Sapporo, both in the normal and large hill.

His son Stig Inge Bjørnebye was a professional footballer, most notably for Liverpool and the Norwegian national team.

References

External links
 

1946 births
2013 deaths
People from Våler, Norway
Olympic ski jumpers of Norway
Ski jumpers at the 1968 Winter Olympics
Ski jumpers at the 1972 Winter Olympics
Sportspeople from Innlandet